Simo can be a Finnish given name (equivalent to Simon) or a Serbian male given name. People named Simo include:

 Simo Aalto (born 1960), Finnish stage magician
 Simo Boltić (born 1994), Serbian sprint canoer
 Simo Elaković (born 1940), Serbian philosopher and professor
 Simo Frangén (born 1963), Finnish TV presenter
 Simó de Guardiola y Hortoneda, Bishop of Urgel and ex officio Co-Prince of Andorra from 1827 to 1851
 Simo Halonen, Finnish biathlete in the 1970s
 Simo Häyhä (1905-2002), Finnish sniper in the Winter War, credited with the most confirmed kills in a major war
 Simo Krunić (born 1967), Serbian football manager and former player
 Simo Kuzmanović (born 1986), Bosnian Serb footballer
 Simo Lampinen (born 1943), Finnish former rally driver
 Simo Mälkiä (born 1983), Finnish retired ice hockey defenceman
 Simo Matavulj (1852–1908), Serbian novelist
 Simo Nikolić (footballer) (born 1954), Yugoslav former footballer
 Simo Nikolić (sailor) (1941–2012), Croatian sailor
 Simo Nurminen (born 1949), Finnish orienteering competitor
 Simo Paavilainen (born 1944), Finnish architect and former dean and professor
 Simo Parpola (born 1943), Finnish archaeologist and professor
 Simo Puupponen (1915-1967), Finnish writer and novelist better known by the pen name Aapeli 
 Simo Rundgren (born 1953), Finnish politician
 Simo Salminen (born 1932), Finnish comic and actor
 Simo Saarinen (born 1963), Finnish retired ice hockey defenceman
 Simo Syrjävaara (born 1943), Finish retired footballer and manager
 Simo Valakari (born 1973), Finnish football manager and retired player
 Simo Vuorilehto (born 1930), Finnish businessman, former Chairman and CEO of Nokia Corporation

See also
 Simo (disambiguation)
 Simović

Finnish masculine given names
Serbian masculine given names